Hypocalymma asperum is a member of the family Myrtaceae endemic to Western Australia.

It blooms between February and March producing pink-white flowers.

It is found along the south coast in the Great Southern and Goldfields-Esperance regions of Western Australia where it grows in sandy to sandy-clay soils.

References

asperum
Endemic flora of Western Australia
Rosids of Western Australia
Plants described in 1844